GL-10 may refer to:

NASA GL-10 Greased Lightning, a hybrid diesel-electric tiltwing aircraft
Subaru Leone, a Japanese-made compact car also called the Subaru GL-10